Salvatore Caruso (born 15 December 1992) is an Italian professional tennis player. He has a career high ATP singles ranking of No. 76 achieved on 16 November 2020. He also has a career high ATP doubles ranking of No. 166 achieved on 18 January 2021. Caruso has won 5 ITF Futures singles and two ATP Challenger singles titles, and 4 ITF Futures and one ATP Challenger doubles titles in his career.

Early Life 
Caruso grew up in Sicily, Italy.

Career

2016
Caruso made his ATP and Masters 1000 main draw debut at the 2016 Italian Open, where he received a main draw wildcard. He lost in the first round to Nick Kyrgios 6–1, 6–2.

2019: Top 100 debut
The 2019 season was a season of a progress. At the 2019 French Open, he got his first Grand Slam win and later reached the third round. He then lost to world No. 1 Novak Djokovic. A month later, he successful participated in the Umag Open. In the second round, he recorded his biggest win to date against World No. 14 Borna Ćorić and advanced to his first ATP quarterfinal. The quarterfinal win against Facundo Bagnis, allowed him to reach his first ATP semifinal as well. He lost to Dušan Lajović in the semifinal. In early October, he won the Barcelona Challenger and secured his place in the top 100 for the first time.

2020: Career-high ranking
Despite not having an impressive season in 2020, Caruso made a bit of a progress. At the 2020 US Open, he reached another Grand Slam third round, recording his first two wins there. He then failed to reach fourth round, after losing to Andrey Rublev. Right after that, he defeated Tennys Sandgren in the first round of Italian Open in order to reach his first Masters 1000 second round. However, he lost to then world No. 1 Novak Djokovic.

The end of the season was important for Caruso. At the 2020 Sofia Open he defeated world No. 21 Félix Auger-Aliassime in order to reach the quarterfinal, and secured a career-high-ranking of World No. 76 on 16 November 2020.

2022: Out of top 250
Caruso initially failed to qualify for the main draw of the 2022 Australian Open, losing in the final round of the qualifying stage, but earned a place in the main draw as a lucky loser after World No. 1 Novak Djokovic was deported from Australia due to COVID-19 visa issues related to the ban for unvaccinated visitors. Caruso took Djokovic's original slot at the top of the draw, having been given the position as the schedule for the opening day had already been released. He lost to another Serb, Miomir Kecmanović, in the first round.

Performance timeline

Singles

Doubles

ATP Tour finals

Doubles: 1 (1 runner-up)

ATP Challenger and ITF Futures finals

Singles: 16 (7 titles, 9 runners–up)

Doubles: 11 (5 titles, 6 runners–up)

Record against top 10 players 
Caruso's match record against players who have been ranked in the top 10. Only ATP Tour main draw and Davis Cup matches are considered. Former no 1 players in bold, retired players in italics.

 Gilles Simon 1–1
 Kevin Anderson 0–1
 Marcos Baghdatis 0–1
 Fabio Fognini 0–1
 Richard Gasquet 0–1
 David Goffin 0–1
 John Isner 0–1
 Kei Nishikori 0–1
 Stefanos Tsitsipas 0–1
 Novak Djokovic 0–2
 Andrey Rublev 0–2

* .

Notes

References

External links 
 
 

1992 births
Living people
Italian male tennis players
People from Avola
Sportspeople from the Province of Syracuse